Glencoe Baobab is the stoutest and second largest baobab (Adansonia digitata L.) in South Africa, and possibly the stoutest tree in the world.

The tree divides into several trunks close to the ground. The main trunk had lowered into the ground a long time ago. In November 2009 the tree split in two parts, opening up an enormous hollow.

The dates "1893" and "1896" are carved on the tree's stem. Radiocarbon dating performed in 2013 suggested an age of 1,835 years.

See also
 List of individual trees

References

External links 
 Wondermondo: Glencoe Baobab

Individual baobab trees
Geography of Limpopo
Individual trees in South Africa